Hired Gun may refer to:

Role
Hired gun, a mercenary soldier, hired professional killer or "torpedo", or someone who  conducts themselves like a mercenary in non-military affairs.
Session musician or "hired gun", a musician who's been hired by a studio or band to play his part on the album or record

Arts, entertainment, and media
Hired Gun (Microsoft), a video game development team
Hired Gun, an Australian country music band, The Hired Guns (1996–2010) started as The Lizard Train
 "Hired Gun", a song from Bad Brains' album I Against I
 "Hired Gun", a song from Chris Rea's album Shamrock Diaries
The Hired Gun (1957 film), a 1957 Western directed by Ray Nazarro
Hired Guns, a 1993 video game from Psygnosis

See also 
 Go Gorilla Go
Hired Hand (disambiguation)